Atrypanius remissus is a species of longhorn beetle of the subfamily Lamiinae. It was described by Wilhelm Ferdinand Erichson in 1847, and is known from northwestern Brazil, eastern Ecuador, Peru, French Guiana, and Bolivia.

References

Beetles described in 1847
Acanthocinini